Sing the Big Hits (a.k.a. The Statler Brothers Sing the Big Hits) is the second studio album by The Statler Brothers. It produced their hit singles "Ruthless" and "You Can't Have Your Kate and Edith, Too" which both peaked at #10 on the Billboard's Hot Country Songs chart.

Track listing

References

External links
 Statler Discography

1967 albums
Columbia Records albums
The Statler Brothers albums
Albums produced by Bob Johnston